Gunnedah was an electoral district of the Legislative Assembly in the Australian state of New South Wales, created in 1880, partly replacing Liverpool Plains, and named after and including Gunnedah. In 1904 it was abolished and replaced by Liverpool Plains and Namoi.

Members for Gunnedah

Election results

References

Former electoral districts of New South Wales
1880 establishments in Australia
Constituencies established in 1880
1904 disestablishments in Australia
Constituencies disestablished in 1904